Stiletto may refer to:
Stiletto, a type of dagger
stitching awl, a tool used in sewing
Stiletto heel, a type of footwear
Stiletto snake, a common name for a family of venomous snakes found in Africa and the Middle East
Stiletto feminism

Military
M80 Stiletto, a prototype naval ship proposed for the United States Navy SEALs
UR-100N, a Russian intercontinental ballistic missile, also known as the "S-19 Stiletto"
USS Stiletto (1885), a wooden torpedo boat
X-3 Stiletto, experimental jet by Douglas Aircraft

Popular culture

Films and television 
Stiletto (1969 film)
Stiletto (2008 film)
"Stiletto", an episode of Smallville; also alternate identity of Lois Lane in that episode
Stiletto Mafiosa, a recurring character in the TV series, Danger Mouse

Music 
Stiletto (album), an album by Lita Ford
Stiletto, a 1989 album by Michael Shrieve
 Stiletto, an Australian group who released Licence to Rage in 1978, which peaked at number 93 on the Australian Kent Music Report.
"Stiletto", a song by Billy Joel from the album 52nd Street
"Stilettos", a 2005 song by Crime Mob
"Stilettos", a 2015 song by Kelsea Ballerini
"Stilettos", a 2010 single by Sirens

Others 
Stiletto (comics), a Marvel Comics character
Stiletto (novel), 2016 novel by Daniel O'Malley
Stiletto, 1960 novel by Harold Robbins

Technology
Sirius Stiletto 100, Sirius satellite radio portable unit
Sirius Stiletto 2, Sirius satellite radio portable unit
Stiletto 27, an American catamaran design
Sunbeam Stiletto, a British motor car